Jean Joyet (21 June 1919 – 14 April 1994) was a French painter of the School of Paris, born in Saint Victurnien.

He was married to the painter Marcelle Deloron. Joyet was linked to other painters of the "Young Picture of the School of Paris" and chiefly to Louis Vuillermoz, Jean-Pierre Alaux and Maurice Boitel, in the group of whom he was invited in the Salon "Comparaisons" with Paul Collomb, Noe Canjura, Daniel du Janerand, Louis Vuillermoz, and André Vignolles.

The Town of Paris and the French State bought some of his works.

1919 births
1994 deaths
20th-century French painters
20th-century French male artists
French male painters